The Principlists fraction was the majority parliamentary group that controlled the 8th legislature of the Islamic Republic of Iran. It was estimated to have at least 190 members.

It was a conservative group led by Ali Larijani. In 2009, a group of pro-Ahmadinejad members founded the group named Islamic Revolution fraction, unsuccessfully trying to unseat Larijni as the speaker. 

In October 2009, Morteza Agha-Tehrani was nominated to stand against Larijani, but lost 7 to 24. The next year, Shahabedin Sadr was defeated by him with 20 votes to 25.

References 

Iranian Parliament fractions
2008 establishments in Iran
2012 disestablishments in Iran
8th legislature of the Islamic Republic of Iran